St Nicholas Football Club Ladies were a women's association football team based in South Gloucestershire, England. The first team played in the  until folding in the summer of 2018. The reserves continued to play in the Gloucestershire County League for the 2018–19 season but moved to a new base in Pucklechurch in 2019 and re-branded as Pucklechurch Sports.

The club's senior women's team was founded in 2008. Until then they had girls' teams up to under-18 level, the addition of the women's team enabled the girls to continue playing at the club beyond that age. Overall, St Nicholas Football club ran 21 teams in boys', girls', men's and women's football.

Team colours
The home kit consisted of black and green shirts and socks, with black shorts, while their away kit was yellow with black trim. Both were manufactured by Zapkam.

References

Association football clubs established in 2008
Association football clubs disestablished in 2019
Defunct women's football clubs in England
FA Women's National League teams
Defunct football clubs in Gloucestershire